Acklam may refer to:

 Acklam, Middlesbrough, now a suburb
 Acklam, Ryedale